Waste minimisation is a set of processes and practices intended to reduce the amount of waste produced.  By reducing or eliminating the generation of harmful and persistent wastes, waste minimisation supports efforts to promote a more sustainable society. Waste minimisation involves redesigning products and processes and/or changing societal patterns of consumption and production.

The most environmentally resourceful, economically efficient, and cost effective way to manage waste often is to not have to address the problem in the first place. Managers see waste minimisation as a primary focus for most waste management strategies. Proper waste treatment and disposal can require a significant amount of time and resources; therefore, the benefits of waste minimisation can be considerable if carried out in an effective, safe and sustainable manner.

Traditional waste management focuses on processing waste after it is created, concentrating on re-use, recycling,  and waste-to-energy conversion. Waste minimisation involves efforts to avoid creating the waste during manufacturing.  To effectively implement waste minimisation the manager requires knowledge of the production process, cradle-to-grave analysis (the tracking of materials from their extraction to their return to earth) and details of the composition of the waste.

The main sources of waste vary from country to country. In the UK, most waste comes from the construction and demolition of buildings, followed by mining and quarrying, industry and commerce. Household waste constitutes a relatively small proportion of all waste.  Industrial waste is often tied to requirements in the supply chain.  For example, a company handling a product may insist that it should be shipped using particular packing because it fits downstream needs.

Benefits
Waste minimisation can protect the environment and often turns out to have positive economic benefits.  Waste minimisation can improve:
Efficient production practices – waste minimisation can achieve more output of product per unit of input of raw materials.
Economic returns – more efficient use of products means reduced costs of purchasing new materials, improving the financial performance of a company. 
Public image – the environmental profile of a company is an important part of its overall reputation and waste minimisation reflects a proactive movement towards environmental protection.
Quality of products produced – new innovation and technological practices can reduce waste generation and improve the quality of the inputs in the production phase.
Environmental responsibility – minimising or eliminating waste generation makes it easier to meet targets of environmental regulations, policies, and standards; the environmental impact of waste will be reduced.

Industries

In industry, using more efficient manufacturing processes and better materials generally reduces the production of waste. The application of waste minimisation techniques has led to the development of innovative and commercially successful replacement products.

Waste minimisation efforts often require investment, which is usually compensated by the savings. However, waste reduction in one part of the production process may create waste production in another part.

Overpackaging is excess packaging.  Eliminating it can result in source reduction, reducing waste before it is generated  by proper package design and practice.  Use of minimized packaging is key to working toward  sustainable packaging.

Processes

 Reuse of scrap material
 Scraps can be immediately re-incorporated at the beginning of the manufacturing line so that they do not become a waste product. Many industries routinely do this; for example, paper mills return any damaged rolls to the beginning of the production line, and in the manufacture of plastic items, off-cuts and scrap are re-incorporated into new products.
 Improved quality control and process monitoring
 Steps can be taken to ensure that the number of reject batches is kept to a minimum.  This is achieved by increasing the frequency of inspection and the number of points of inspection. For example, installing automated continuous monitoring equipment can help to identify production problems at an early stage.
 Waste exchanges
 This is where the waste product of one process becomes the raw material for a second process. Waste exchanges represent another way of reducing waste disposal volumes for waste that cannot be eliminated.
 Ship to point of use
 This involves making deliveries of incoming raw materials or components direct to the point where they are assembled or used in the manufacturing process to minimise handling and the use of protective wrappings or enclosures (example: Fish-booking).
Zero waste
 This is a whole systems approach that aims to eliminate waste at the source and at all points down the supply chain, with the intention of producing no waste. It is a design philosophy which emphasizes waste prevention as opposed to end of pipe waste management. Since, globally speaking, waste as such, however minimal, can never be prevented (there will always be an end-of-life even for recycled products and materials), a related goal is prevention of pollution.
 Minimalism
Minimalism often refers to the concepts of art and music, even though a minimal lifestyle could make a huge impact for waste management and producing zero waste, can reduce which courses landfill and environment pollution. When the endless consumption is reduced to minimum of only necessary consumption, the careless production towards the demand will be reduced. A minimal lifestyle can impact the climate justice in a way by reducing the waste. Joshua Fields Millburn and Ryan Nicodemus directed and produced a movie called Minimalism: A Documentary that showcased the idea of minimal living in the modern world.

Product design

Waste minimisation and resource maximisation for manufactured products can most easily be done at the design stage. Reducing the number of components used in a product or making the product easier to take apart can make it easier to be repaired or recycled at the end of its useful life.

In some cases, it may be best not to minimise the volume of raw materials used to make a product, but instead reduce the volume or toxicity of the waste created at the end of a product's life, or the environmental impact of the product's use.  (See section Durability).

Fitting the intended use
In this strategy, products and packages are optimally designed to meet their intended use.  This applies especially to packaging materials, which should only be as durable as necessary to serve their intended purpose. On the other hand, it could be more wasteful if food, which has consumed resources and energy in its production, is damaged and spoiled because of extreme measures to reduce the use of paper, metals, glass and plastics in its packaging.

Durability
Improving product durability, such as extending a vacuum cleaner's useful life to 15 years instead of 12, can reduce waste and usually much improves resource optimisation.

But in some cases it has a negative environmental impact.  If a product is too durable, its replacement with more efficient technology is likely to be delayed. Therefore, extending an older machine's useful life may place a heavier burden on the environment than scrapping it, recycling its metal and buying a new model.  Similarly, older vehicles consume more fuel and produce more emissions than their modern counterparts.

Most proponents of waste minimisation consider that the way forward may be to view any manufactured product at the end of its useful life as a resource for recycling and reuse rather than waste.

Making refillable glass bottles strong enough to withstand several journeys between the consumer and the bottling plant requires making them thicker and so heavier, which increases the resources required to transport them. Since transport has a large environmental impact, careful evaluation is required of the number of return journeys bottles make.  If a refillable bottle is thrown away after being refilled only several times, the resources wasted may be greater than if the bottle had been designed for a single journey..

Many choices involve trade-offs of environmental impact, and often there is insufficient information to make informed decisions.

Retail
Various aspects of business practices affect waste, such as the use of disposable tableware in restaurants.

Reusable shopping bags
Reusable bags are a visible form of re-use, and some stores offer a "bag credit" for re-usable shopping bags, although at least one chain reversed its policy, claiming "it was just a temporary bonus".  In contrast, one study suggests that a bag tax is a more effective incentive than a similar discount.  (Of note, the before/after study compared a circumstance in which some stores offered a discount vs. a circumstance in which all stores applying the tax.)  While there is a minor inconvenience involved, this may remedy itself, as reusable bags are generally more convenient for carrying groceries.

Households
This section details some waste minimisation techniques for householders.

Appropriate amounts and sizes can be chosen when purchasing goods; buying large containers of paint for a small decorating job or buying larger amounts of food than can be consumed create unnecessary waste. Also, if a pack or can is to be thrown away, any remaining contents must be removed before the container can be recycled.

Home composting, the practice of turning kitchen and garden waste into compost can be considered waste minimisation.

The resources that households use can be reduced considerably by using electricity thoughtfully (e.g. turning off lights and equipment when it is not needed) and by reducing the number of car journeys made. Individuals can reduce the amount of waste they create by buying fewer products and by buying products which last longer. Mending broken or worn items of clothing or equipment also contributes to minimising household waste. Individuals can minimise their water usage, and walk or cycle to their destination rather than using their car to save fuel and cut down emissions.

In a domestic situation, the potential for minimisation is often dictated by lifestyle.  Some people may view it as wasteful to purchase new products solely to follow fashion trends when the older products are still usable.  Adults working full-time have little free time, and so may have to purchase more convenient foods that require little preparation, or prefer disposable nappies if there is a baby in the family.

The amount of waste an individual produces is a small portion of all waste produced by society, and personal waste reduction can only make a small impact on overall waste volumes.  Yet, influence on policy can be exerted in other areas. Increased consumer awareness of the impact and power of certain purchasing decisions allows industry and individuals to change the total resource consumption.  Consumers can influence manufacturers and distributors by avoiding buying products that do not have eco-labelling, which is currently not mandatory, or choosing products that minimise the use of packaging. In the UK, PullApart combines both environmental and consumer packaging surveys, in a curbside packaging recycling classification system to minimise waste. Where reuse schemes are available, consumers can be proactive and use them.

Healthcare facilities

Healthcare establishments are massive producers of waste. The major sources of healthcare waste are:  hospitals, laboratories and research centres, mortuary and autopsy centres, animal research and testing laboratories, blood banks and collection services, and nursing homes for the elderly.

Waste minimisation can offer many opportunities to these establishments to use fewer resources, be less wasteful and generate less hazardous waste.  Good management and control practices among health-care facilities can have a significant effect on the reduction of waste generated each day.

Practices

There are many examples of more efficient practices that can encourage waste minimization in healthcare establishments and research facilities

Source reduction
Purchasing reductions which ensures the selection of supplies that are less wasteful or less hazardous.
The use of physical rather than chemical cleaning methods such as steam disinfection instead of chemical disinfection.
Preventing the unnecessary wastage of products in nursing and cleaning activities.

Management and control measures at hospital level
Centralized purchasing of hazardous chemicals.
Monitoring the flow of chemicals within the health care facility from receipt as a raw material to disposal as a hazardous waste.
The careful separation of waste matter to help minimize the quantities of hazardous waste and disposal.

Stock management of chemical and pharmaceutical products
Frequent ordering of relatively small quantities rather than large quantities at one time.
Using the oldest batch of a product first to avoid expiration dates and unnecessary waste.
Using all the contents of a container containing hazardous waste.
Checking the expiry date of all products at the time of delivery.

See also

Cleaner production
Eco-action
Ecological economics
Ecological sanitation
Electronics right to repair
European Week for Waste Reduction
Extended producer responsibility
Food waste
Green consumption
Green economy
Household hazardous waste
Life-cycle assessment
List of waste management acronyms
Litter
Miniwaste
Planned obsolescence
Recycling
Reusable launch vehicle
Reusable packaging
Reuse of bottles
Reuse of human excreta
Reuse
Source reduction
Sustainable sanitation
Waste hierarchy
Waste management
Zero waste

References

External links
 The EU Pre-waste project website, homepage.

 
Waste management concepts
Industrial ecology